Julia Compton Moore (February 10, 1929April 18, 2004) was the wife of Lieutenant General (Ret.) Hal Moore, a United States Army officer. Her efforts and complaints in the aftermath of the Battle of Ia Drang prompted the U.S. Army to set up survivor support networks and casualty notification teams consisting of uniformed officers, which are still in use.

Early life and education
Compton was born in Fort Sill, Oklahoma, the only child of future U.S. Army Colonel Louis J. Compton and Elizabeth Boon Compton. Julie would grow up as the typical "Army brat" and experience numerous relocations as the family followed Colonel Compton. Julie described what an "Army brat" was in a 1996 letter. "The term "Army Brat" does not fall into the dictionary meaning of a "a nasty child". Far from it. Used with warmth, it's special meaning is a child born into an Army family. Army brats the world over, many of whom knew each other while growing up on various Army Posts, are constantly running into each other all their lives. They are, in themselves, a kind of "family" - each member of which knows what it means to have lived their youth in an Army family constantly on the move and in a disciplined Army environment."From Fort Sill, the family travelled to the Fort Stotsenberg in the Philippines on the US Grant where Compton commanded a Field Artillery battery for 38 months. The Army in the 1930s was very formal and Julie recalled her parents telling her they had to be ready to formally receive visitors each evening. Louis and Elizabeth would lay out their formal clothes on the bed and quick change into them if a visitor arrived. Following the assignment in the Philippines, the family was stationed at Aberdeen Proving Ground in Maryland, Washington DC, Fort Leavenworth KS, with their final tour of duty at Fort Bragg NC. Colonel Compton commanded the Army Field Forces Board #1. Notably, Julie's future husband, Hal Moore, was a parachute tester under his future father-in-law's command. 

From the age of 12, she began a lifelong journey of experiencing the separation and risk of loss in war. While the family remained in Chevy Chase, MD, her father had multiple different assignments during World War II requiring him to serve in numerous different locations. As the commander of the 15th Army, Colonel Compton oversaw the deployment of the unit from Fort Sam Houston, TX to the European Theater. Julie was first exposed to the horror of war when  family learned her father's troopship, the SS Empire Javelin, was sunk in transit to France.  As a result of the calm discipline of the troops, all but three survived the sinking. Upon return of her father from World War II in December, 1946, the family moved to Fort Leavenworth followed by Fort Bragg in 1948. While World War II was her first exposure to war, she would experience it again when her husband served in the Korean War and Vietnam War, and one of her sons fought with the 82nd Airborne Division in Panama and the Persian Gulf War.

Compton was a graduate of Chevy Chase Junior College, Chevy Chase, Maryland and attended the University of North Carolina at Chapel Hill, as a member of Pi Beta Phi sorority, prior to her marriage.

Korean War 
Julie describes her experience during the Korean War in the 1996 letter:I decided the summer of '49 that Hal Moore was the man for me and chased him till he caught me. We were married in November and first child was born 18 months later at Fort Bragg. We moved to Fort Benning when Greg was 4 months old and Hal attended the Advanced Infantry Officers Course. All the Bragg crowd went with us. Toward the end of the school year Hal received the orders I had been dreading - Korean War! I was highly pregnant with Steve and he refused to come on time. The doctors made me drink cod liver oil in hopes of speeding him up but he finally arrived on May 4 and Hal left for Korea six weeks later in June. 

I was 23 years old. I stayed in the high heat and humidity of Columbus, Ga in a tiny tract house with no air conditioning for another 3 months by myself as my parents hadn't found a place to live yet. I planned to move in with them in Auburn, AL. It was so awful though as there was NO NEWS of what was going on during that war. Sometimes I would find a paragraph or two on the back page of the Opelika-Auburn Daily News paper. If there was a big fight like Pork Chop Hill, the Atlanta paper might mention it. Sometimes I think I was better off not knowing compared to the intensive coverage of Vietnam. Course we didn't have TV then either. Hal sent me a telegram wishing us all a Merry Christmas which I found in the mailbox. I thought it was bad news and refused to open it so Dad had to do it. You can imagine the relief. I told him never to send me another telegram, and have always "frozen" when I see one so the debacle of the telegrams from X-Ray paralyzed me.

My two best friends in Auburn were Evie whose husband had been killed winning the Medal of Honor and Jean whose husband was a prisoner of war. Not a happy group.

Career 
Wherever her husband was stationed, Moore served as a Brownie and Girl Scout Leader and Cub Scout Den Mother. She volunteered with the Red Cross in the Army hospitals. She supported the day care centers and worked with the wives clubs to take better care of the enlisted soldier and his family. Moore was especially active in setting up the Army Community Service organizations that are now a permanent fixture on all army posts and which assist each soldier as they process into their new duty stations.

Vietnam

Deployment 
Julie describes her experience during Hal's deployment in the same 1996 letter:We had a tight knit group of wives that really tried to help each other, took over if one got sick or needed help with the children.

It is really hard to describe the special closeness that Army wives have to each other. Even though I was lucky enough to end up a General's wife, I never forgot that I started out as a lieutenant's wife and the burdens they carried of raising young children with never enough money or husband.

When we received the news from President Johnson in late July of '65 that the 1st Cav would go to Vietnam there was a flurry of activity among the wives to get the men packed up. At that time the Army had no camouflage insignia or underwear so our great concern was dying their underwear (two forest green to one black was the standard formula we came down on - I know the Chattahooche river ran green for months) - inking out the white name tag and the gold U.S. Army on their fatigue shirts. We were told we had 30 days to get out of the Army quarters on the Post so there was a great scramble to find a place to live outside the gate in the little town of Columbus. 438 wives settled in the area. Dad wanted me to come to Auburn (40 miles from Columbus, GA.) and I felt that I owed him a year with his grandchildren so looked over there but nothing that we could fit into for rent and only a $30,000 house to buy which was way too expensive. I found a dinky house in an area of Columbus that a lot of wives had settled in, close to the Post. The 3 younger children (3-11 years old) had the largest bedroom - poor Dave slept on a cot which we put up every night and took down every morning - Greg and Steve (13 and 12) shared a room and I had the smallest room - could only get out of bed on one side!

We tried to keep the night Hal left like any other in the family. All had dinner together, he read Ceci and Davy their evening story, finished the last minute packing. We went to bed. I tried to sleep but I just hung on to him. When he got up to leave around 1:30 a.m. I pretended to be asleep as knew I would start crying and didn't want him to worry about us. He had enough on his mind. I heard the back door shut, got up and leaned against the upstairs window and watched while the jeep pulled away in the dark then I cried. I was 34 years old.

I will never forget that Monday morning in Nov. '65 when I picked up the Columbus GA. Ledger off the front stoop and opened it up to Joe's story. I must have read it 10 times trying to comprehend what had happened and that name Lt. Col. Hal Moore kept jumping out at me. Somehow I got the children off to school and drove Dave's nursery school carpool. When I got home the phone started ringing and didn't quit. I totally forgot to pick up the car pool until the school called! Even Peter Jennings called to set up an interview that night with the local TV station. He wanted to film our reaction to seeing Hal on the evening news program. I did not want to do it but the Public Information Officer at Ft. Benning asked me to. I was so stunned at seeing my husband with tears in his eyes that I could hardly speak. I should have known better as the Sergeants were his brothers and the privates his sons - no one can lose that many family members and not weep. We did not make the next evenings news.

Casualty notification
The Ia Drang Campaign was the first major ground engagement involving U.S. forces in Vietnam. The Army had not yet set up an adequate system of notifying the next of kin of battlefield fatalities. Instead, the telegrams were given to taxicab drivers for delivery, as depicted in the film We Were Soldiers. Unlike the film depiction, Moore did not actually assume responsibility for the delivery of the telegrams, however, she accompanied the cab drivers who delivered the telegrams and assisted in the death notifications, grieving with the widows and families of men killed in battle, and attended the funerals of those who fell under her husband's command. Her complaints to the Pentagon, and the example that she set, prompted the Army to immediately set up notification teams consisting of a uniformed officer and a chaplain. Julie commented on the telegrams:I can't really add any more to the horror those women suffered being told in such a cruel way that isn't in the book. I will never forget that tense moment when the yellow cab stopped at my door. I saw the driver get out, come up the walk. I was alone so hid behind the drapes and prayed he would go away but he kept coming. When he rang the bell I decided not to answer, that way everything would be alright. I finally said to myself come on Julie , you have to face up to what's to come so answer the door. He only wanted help in locating a house number. I literally sagged against the door jamb, white as a sheet I was so relieved. Told him to never do that to anyone again. He was so apologetic. Said all the cab drivers had really hated that duty.

Continuing coverage and return home 
Julie wraps up the letter as she summarizes the last part of Hal's combat tour.It was so lonely at night after the children were in bed not to have him to talk to, to get advice on problems, handling all the finances, making ALL decisions. It was so different though than the Korean War as I did have so many friends around in the same boat. It was the same for the children. Instead of being the odd person with no father they thought it strange that some kid had a father around.

Everything seemed to go along ok until about 9 months then I noticed that the wives were starting to have trouble. I had to get one wife into psychiatric counseling, (her first husband had been killed in Korea), gals were coming down sick, even I ended up with a hysterectomy in April '66. We were about at the end of our ropes and I think a lot of it was the constant TV and newspaper coverage. We grew up in a hurry listening to the troops talk and seeing the actual action and hearing the gunfire. The news got home so fast we wondered if it beat the telegrams and would we get one the next day.

One of the worst times was when I thought Hal was on his way home. I was waiting for the call from San Francisco, the children had made a big Welcome Home sign for Dad and I was watching the noon news on TV when I suddenly heard "Colonel Hal Moore said". I knew he was in another fight and only God knew when he would get back. I certainly did not want him killed when he was so close to coming home. I learned later that his replacement was on hand but when his brigade was ordered out to rescue a cut-off American Battalion, he refused to turn his men over to a new commander going into a fight. Even though I learned at my father's knee that to a truly dedicated Army officer such as he and my husband were," the troops ALWAYS come first", you get this terrible feeling that you will NEVER come first, it will ALWAYS be the troops and anger takes over. I was really hurt and furious with Hal. I felt that we had all given enough!!

All was forgiven when I finally saw him get off that airplane, in Atlanta, Ga. terribly skinny but alive.

Death
Moore died on April 18, 2004 and is buried at the Fort Benning Main Post Cemetery, near her mother and father, and in the middle of the 7th Cavalry troopers killed in action at Landing Zone Xray.  Her husband of 55 years died in 2017 on her birthday, and was laid to rest beside her.

Legacy

Julia Compton Moore Award
One of Julia Moore's more important contributions to the quality of Army family life is summed up by the Ben Franklin Global Forum's press release, announcing the establishment of the Julia Compton Moore Award:

The award recognizes the civilian spouses of soldiers for "Outstanding Contributions to the United States Army".

Personal life
Compton was married on November 22, 1949 to Hal Moore, who later commanded the 1st Battalion, 7th Cavalry in the battle of the Ia Drang Valley in Vietnam in 1965. They have five children:
Harold Gregory Moore III
LTC Stephen Moore, USA (Ret)
Julie Moore Orlowski
Cecile Moore Rainey
COL David Moore, USA (Ret)

as well as twelve grandchildren. Two of their sons are career U.S. Army officers: one a retired colonel and another a retired lieutenant colonel.

In popular culture
 Moore was portrayed by Madeleine Stowe in the 2002 film We Were Soldiers.

See also
We Were Soldiers Once ... And Young
Joseph L. Galloway

Notes

References

 
 

1929 births
2004 deaths
People from Fort Sill, Oklahoma
American female military personnel of the Vietnam War
Battle of Ia Drang
American women in the Vietnam War